The following is a non-comprehensive list of Iranian doctors that lived from medieval times up until the beginning of the modern age.

By "Iranian", all the peoples of historic Persia are meant, i.e., what is today Iran, Afghanistan, and all the countries of Central Asia ("common modern definition") that were historically part of the Persian empire, whether or not such people were ethnic Persians or Iranians. In some cases, their exact ancestry is unclear. They may have emigrated or immigrated, and thus may appear in other "Lists of", but nevertheless their names and work are somehow linked to the words "Iranian" and/or "Persian".

A

 Abdolrahman, Sheikh Muhammad
 Abhari, mathematician
 Ahmad ibn Farrokh
 Ahmad Ibn Imad ul-din and chemist
 Al-Qumri, Persian physician
 Al-Nafis, Persian physician
 Amuli, Muhammad ibn Mahmud 
 Aqa-Kermani
 Aqsara'i
 Arzani, Muqim
 Astarabadi
 Avicenna (Ibn Sina), philosopher

B

 Bukhtishu, Persian Christian physicians of Academy of Gundishapur
 Bukhtishu, Abdollah ibn
 Bukhtishu, Gabriel ibn
 Bukhtishu, Yuhanna
 Burzoe, aka Borzouyeh-i Tabib of Academy of Gundishapur

C
Ctesias

E

 Esfarayeni

G

 Gilani, Hakim, royal physician
 Gorgani, Zayn al-Din Isma‘il ibn, royal physician
 Gorgani, Rustam
 Gorgani e Masihi, see Masihi Gorgani, Avicenna's master

H
 Hajji Zayn al-Attar
 Hakim Ghulam Imam
 Hakim Muhammad Mehdi Naqi
 Hakim Muhammad Sharif Khan
 Haly Abbas, prominent physician
 Harawi, Muhammad ibn Yusuf
 Hasani, Qavameddin

J

 Jaghmini
 Jaldaki
 Juzjani, Abu Ubaid

K

 Kazerouni, Masoud
 Kermani, Iwad
 Khazeni, Abolfath, physicist
 Khorasani, Sultan Ali

M

 Majusi, Ibn Abbas
 Masihi Gorgani, Avicenna's master
 Muwaffaq, Abu mansur, pharmacologist
 Masawaiyh or Masuya

N
 Nagawri
 Nakhshabi
 Natili Tabari
 Neishaburi
 Nurbakhshi

O

 Ostanes

Q

 Qazwini, Zakariya

R

 Razi, Zakariya (Rhazes), chemist and physicist, discoverer of Alcohol

S

 Sahl, Shapur ibn
 Samarqandi, Najibeddin
 Shahrazuri, philosopher and physician
 Shirazi, Imad al-Din Mas'ud
 Shirazi, Muhammad Hadi Khorasani
 Shirazi, Mahmud ibn Ilyas
 Shirazi, Najm al-Din Mahmud ibn Ilyas
 Shirazi, Qurayshi
 Sijzi, Mas'ud

T

 Tabari, Abul Hasan
 Tabari, Ibn Sahl, Jewish convert physician Master of Rhazes
 Tabrizi, Maqsud Ali
 Tunakabuni
 Tughra'i

V

 Amin al-Din Rashid al-Din Vatvat, scholar and physician

See also

 List of Iranian scientists
 Nizamiyyah
 Academy of Gundishapur
 Modern Iranian scientists and engineers
 List of universities in Iran
 Darolfonoon
 Higher education in Iran
 Islamic scholars
 Ophthalmology in medieval Islam
 Astronomy in Islam

Medieval doctors
Persian
Medieval Persian doctors